Valley City is an unincorporated community in northeast Johnson County, in the U.S. state of Missouri.

The community is on Missouri Route MM approximately seven miles north-northeast of Knob Noster. The community sits above a small tributary stream valley approximately one-half mile east of the Blackwater River.

History
A post office called Valley City was established in 1887, and remained in operation until 1903. The community was so named due to its setting in a valley. Earlier names include Gallaher's Mill, Kirkpatrick Mill, Millford, and Grover.

References

Unincorporated communities in Johnson County, Missouri
Unincorporated communities in Missouri